Gary Richard Cunningham (born 12 May 1955) is a former New Zealand rugby union player. A wing and centre, Cunningham represented Auckland and North Harbour at a provincial level, and was a member of the New Zealand national side, the All Blacks, in 1979 and 1980. He played 17 matches for the All Blacks including five internationals.

References

1955 births
Living people
Rugby union players from Auckland
People educated at Takapuna Grammar School
New Zealand rugby union players
New Zealand international rugby union players
Auckland rugby union players
North Harbour rugby union players
Rugby union wings
Rugby union centres